Fikri Ihsandi Hadmadi (born 1 March 1995, in Tangerang) is an Indonesian badminton player.

Achievements 

 BWF International Challenge  BWF International Series tournament

Performance timeline

Indonesian team 
 Junior level

Individual competitions 
 Junior level

 Senior level

References

1995 births
Living people
Indonesian male badminton players
People from Tangerang
Sportspeople from Banten